The 2010–11 season was the 128th season of competitive soccer in Australia.

Promotion and relegation (pre-season) 
Teams promoted to the A-League 2010-11
 Melbourne Heart

Teams promoted to the New South Wales Premier League 2010
 Rockdale City Suns FC

Teams demoted to the New South Wales Super League
 Penrith Nepean United FC (Now Defunct)

Teams promoted to the Victorian Premier League 2010
 Bentleigh Greens FC
 Northcote City SC

Teams demoted to the Victorian State League Division One
 Preston Lions FC
 Whittlesea Zebras FC

Managerial changes

A-League

New South Wales Premier League

Victorian Premier League

Events

January 
 6th: Australia play their final away game for the 2011 AFC Asian Cup qualification against Kuwait in Kuwait City and draw 2–2.

February 
 9th: Central Coast Mariners manager Lawrie McKinna is sacked from his position as head manager, and reassigned to director of footballing operations at the club, following a 2009 AFC Champions League campaign in which the Mariners failed to win a game, as well as missing out on the finals for the 2009–10 A-League season.
 10th: Former Socceroos player and manager Graham Arnold is announced as the second-ever manager of the Central Coast Mariners the day after Lawrie McKinna was reassigned other duties within the club.
 14th: Sydney FC defeat Melbourne Victory 2–0 at the Sydney Football Stadium in their final round 27 match to win the Premiers Plate, and book their position into the Asian Champions League

March 
 3rd: Australia play Indonesia in Brisbane and win 1–0, clinching qualification through to the 2011 AFC Asian Cup.
 20th: Sydney FC defeat arch rivals Melbourne Victory 4–2 on penalties at Etihad Stadium in the 2010 A-League Grand Final giving Sydney FC their 2nd Championship and first Premiership & Championship double.

April 
 6th: North Queensland Fury manager Ian Ferguson announces he will be leaving the club as head manager and joining the Perth Glory following a turbulent season which saw him come under much scrutiny following results, players chosen as well as off field issues, including a public spiff with marquee player Robbie Fowler, who also signed with Perth Glory in the off season.
 10th: Australia national team coach Pim Verbeek announced he will be quitting as Socceroos coach post-World Cup and will join the Morocco Football Federation as National Youth Technical Director.
 27th: Adelaide United lose the final match of their Group H match against Shandong Luneng in the 2010 AFC Champions League group stage however move through to the next round.
 28th: Melbourne Victory are knocked out of the Group Stage of the 2010 Asian Champions League, finishing last in Group E.

May 
 12th: Adelaide United are knocked out of the 2010 Asian Champions League after going down 3–2 in extra time to K-League club Jeonbuk Hyundai Motors in Adelaide.
 24th: Australia play their final game on Australian Soil before the 2010 World Cup against New Zealand at the Melbourne Cricket Ground, Australia win 2–1 with goals from Dario Vidosic & Brett Holman.

June 
 1st: Australia play a friendly against Denmark in South Africa and win 1–0.
 3rd: Aurelio Vidmar coach of Adelaide United steps down to accept a role as Socceroos assistant coach as well as head coach for the Australia national under-23 football team during the 2012 Olympic Games in London.
 5th: Australia play a friendly against the United States in South Africa and lose 3–1.
 7th: North Queensland Fury announce they have signed former Czechoslovakian international František Straka as their head manager for the 2010-11 A-League season, following Ian Ferguson's departure to Perth Glory.
 13th: 2010 FIFA World Cup: Australia are defeated 4–0 by Germany in their opening group game of the World Cup. Midfielder Tim Cahill was controversially sent off.
 19th: 2010 FIFA World Cup: Australia draw their game against Ghana 1–1 in an eventful match which saw star striker Harry Kewell sent off, Australia's second of the tournament.
 24th: 2010 FIFA World Cup: Australia win their final game against Serbia 2–1, however it is not enough to qualify for the Round of 16, Germany defeating Ghana 1–0. to top the group, with Ghana coming second, Australia third, and Serbia 4th.

July 
 1st: Socceroos veteran Craig Moore retires from both international and club football following Australia's exit from the 2010 FIFA World Cup.

August 
 5th: The 2010-11 A-League season kicks off with new team Melbourne Heat being defeated by Central Coast Mariners 1–0 at AAMI Park in front of 11,000.
 11th: The Socceroos lose 2–0 to Slovenia in a friendly at Športni park Stožice, Slovenia.

September 
 7th: Australia defeat Poland 2–1 in Poland.

Retirements 
 11 February 2010: Steve Corica, 37-year-old Sydney FC midfielder after sustaining a hamstring injury in the final game of the season against Melbourne Victory which required surgery, thus ending his season. Corica represented Australia 32 times, scoring 5 times.
 11 February 2010: Robbie Middleby, 34-year-old North Queensland Fury midfielder. Previously played for Sydney FC, as well as several clubs in the old National Soccer League.
 3 May 2010: Mark Rudan, 34-year-old Adelaide United midfielder. Previously played for Sydney FC, as well as Avispa Fukuoka and FC Vaduz. Also represented Australia 3 times, although never scored for his country.
 1 July 2010: Craig Moore, 34 years old, former Brisbane Roar and Socceroos defender. Played nearly 200 games for Scottish Premier League club Rangers F.C., as well as in England with Crystal Palace and Newcastle United. Finished his career in the A-League with Brisbane Roar before a pre-world cup stint in Greece with AO Kavala. Represented the Australia national team 52 times, including 2 FIFA World Cup Appearances in Germany and in South Africa, after which he announced his retirement from club and international football.
 2 July 2010: Scott Chipperfield, 34 years old, FC Basel player announces his retirement from international football. However will continue playing for Swiss Super League club FC Basel for the upcoming 2010–11 season, with his full retirement expected to be announced soon after. Played 68 times, scoring 12 goals for Australia and represented his country in both the 2006 FIFA World Cup in Germany, and the 2010 FIFA World Cup in South Africa.

National teams

Men's senior

Friendlies

AFC Asian Cup

Men's under-23

Friendlies

Olympic qualifying

Men's under-20

Friendlies

AFF U-19 Youth Championship

AFC U-19 Championship

League tables

2010–11 Hyundai A-League

2010 NSWPL

2010 VPL

Trophy & League Champions

Australian clubs in international competition

Summary

Melbourne Victory

Sydney FC

References 

 
 
Seasons in Australian soccer